José Maria Rodrigues Alves, better known as Zé Maria, (born May 18, 1949 in Botucatu) is a former association footballer.

During his career (1966–1983) he played for Ferroviário (SP), Portuguesa, Corinthians and Internacional (RS) as a defender.

For the Brazilian team he played in 46 games from 1968 to 1978. He was a member of the Brazilian squad at the 1970 FIFA World Cup (as a reserve who did not play), but he played in four matches during the 1974 FIFA World Cup.

References

1949 births
Living people
Brazilian footballers
Brazil international footballers
Brazilian football managers
Association football defenders
Campeonato Brasileiro Série A players
1970 FIFA World Cup players
1974 FIFA World Cup players
FIFA World Cup-winning players
Associação Portuguesa de Desportos players
Sport Club Corinthians Paulista players
Associação Atlética Internacional (Limeira) players
Sport Club Corinthians Paulista managers
Footballers from São Paulo (state)
Associação Atlética Internacional (Limeira) managers